Claudius Madrolle (22 July 1870 – 16 June 1949) was a French explorer in Africa and Asia and editor of travel guides who specialized in the Far East. Publishers included Comité de l'Asie Française, Hachette and the Société d'Éditions Géographiques, Maritimes et Coloniales.
In 1902, thanks to this young and wealthy French explorer, was published the first of a serie of travel guides to the Far East. From the beginning, he designed his project to match the spirit of well-known guides such as Baedeker, Joanne or Murray. A collection indeed, as a total of 70 guides, 11 of them in English, were published between 1902 and 1939. This period, during which Far East countries were slowly embracing tourism, was also a period of considerable political and social turmoil. For Claudius Madrolle, these changes added serious hurdles to the completion of his project.

Works

 
 
 
 
  (Index)

References
 Jean Malochet, 'Les Guides Madrolle 1902-1939, des guides français pour l'Extrême-Orient. Bibliographie commentée et illustrée'. Librairie les routes du globe. Paris. 2018.

External links
 
 Open Library. Works by Madrolle

People from Dieppe, Seine-Maritime
1870 births
1949 deaths
French travel writers
French male non-fiction writers